Bhumika Chawla (born Rachna Chawla; 21 August 1978) is an Indian actress known for her work predominantly in Telugu, Tamil, Malayalam and Hindi films. She began her acting career with the Telugu film Yuvakudu (2000) and then seen in Kushi for which she won Filmfare Award for Best Actress - Telugu. Chawla is the recipient of one Filmfare Awards South, and SIIMA Award.

She made her debut in Hindi Cinema with the romantic tragedy film Tere Naam (2003) which was huge critical and commercial success and earned her Zee Cine Award Best Female Debut. Chawla then subsequently appeared in several successful films including Dil Ne Jise Apna Kahaa (2004), Anasuya (2007) and Middle Class Abbayi (2017).

Early life
Chawla was born 21 August 1978 in a Punjabi family in New Delhi, India and completed her schooling there. Her father is a retired Army officer. Bhumika has two siblings, an elder brother and sister.

She moved to Mumbai in 1997 and started her career with Ad films and Hindi music video albums. She appeared in the Zee TV series Hip Hip Hurray and Star Best Sellers - Fursat Mein.

Career
Chawla started off her film career in the Telugu film industry, starring in the feature film Yuvakudu (2000) alongside actor Sumanth. Her second release, Kushi (2001), in which she starred opposite Pawan Kalyan was a box office success, winning her the Filmfare Award for Best Actress – Telugu following which she acted in several films in Telugu, including Okkadu (2003) opposite Mahesh Babu and Simhadri (2003) opposite Jr. NTR, which became two of the year's highest grossers in Telugu. Meanwhile, she made her debut in the Tamil film industry as well, starring in the film Badri (2001) opposite actor Vijay, which was followed by her second Tamil film Roja Kootam (2002). Her performance in Missamma (2003), as a businesswoman with cancer, was applauded. She was nominated for the FilmfareAward for Best Actress – Telugu and won the Nandi Award for Best Actress.

After a number of critically and commercially successful films in the South, Chawla starred in her first Bollywood film, Tere Naam (2003), alongside Salman Khan. The film was one of the year's highest grossers. It was a critical success and her performance in the film won her many positive notices as well as several nominations for Best Debut at different award ceremonies. She was nominated for her first Filmfare Best Actress Award and won the Best Debut trophy at the Zee Cine Awards ceremony.

Subsequently, she starred in a number of Hindi films including Run (2004), a remake of the same-named Tamil film, Dil Ne Jise Apna Kahaa (2004), again opposite Salman Khan, Silsilay (2005) and Dil Jo Bhi Kahey... (2005) alongside Amitabh Bachchan. She returned to Telugu, acting in the films Naa Autograph (2004) (a remake of the Tamil film Autograph) and Jai Chiranjeeva, alongside Chiranjeevi and Sameera Reddy. While Chawla's performance in the former won her accolades and the CineMAA Jury Award for Best Actress, the latter became a super hit film.

In 2006, Chawla appeared in the Tamil film Sillunu Oru Kaadhal, alongside real-life couple Surya and Jyothika which became a big hit worldwide, while playing a vital role in the Hindi film Family - Ties of Blood, in which she shared screen space with Amitabh Bachchan and Akshay Kumar, and starring in the Telugu fantasy film, Mayabazar. Following this, she acted in the Hindi film Gandhi, My Father as Gulab Gandhi and played the title roles in the Telugu films Sathyabhama, in which she played a woman who has Short-term memory loss, and Anasuya, a crime thriller, and in the Bhojpuri film, Gangotri (2007 film), a sequel to the successful 2006 Bhojpuri film Ganga, acting again alongside Amitabh Bachchan. Her performance in Anasuya (2007), as an Investigative journalist who covers the case of a serial killer, received critical acclaim. She was nominated for the Filmfare Award for Best Actress – Telugu and won the Santosham Best Actress Award.

In 2008, she made her debut in the Punjabi film industry, starring in Yaariyan, opposite Gurdas Maan, following which she debuted in Malayalam as well, starring in Bhramaram alongside Mohanlal. Currently, she is working on half-a-dozen films in Tamil, Telugu and Hindi, which include Thangar Bachan's Kalavadiya Pozhudugal opposite Prabhu Deva in Tamil, Yagam alongside Navdeep in Telugu .  She also appeared in the 2016 movie M.S. Dhoni: The Untold Story. She portrayed the character of MS dhoni's sister in the movie. She has done MCA in Telugu in the year 2017 for which she got the Best Supporting Actress SIIMA and Zee Apsara Best Supporting Actress. She also appeared in Telugu - Tamil U Turn which got great reviews.

She marked her debut in Web Series with Bhram in 2018 alongside Kalki Koechlin and Sanjay Suri.

She is currently working in two Telugu films, Seetimaar and Idhe  Maa Katha and Operation Majnu, which are due for release in 2021.

Chawla will be next seen in her upcoming sports action movie 'Seetimaarr'. Directed by Sampath Nandi. The movie star cast also includes Gopichand, Tamannaah, Digangana Suryavanshi.

Personal life
Chawla married her long-time boyfriend and yoga teacher Bharat Thakur on 21 October 2007 at Devlali, Nashik in a Gurdwara. She went regularly to Thakur's courses and is said to have dated him for four years before marrying him. The couple has a son born in February 2014.

Filmography

Awards and nominations

 
|- 
| 2001
| Kushi
| Filmfare Award for Best Actress - Telugu
| 
|-
| 2003
| Missamma 
| Filmfare Award for Best Actress - Telugu
| 
|- 
| 2003
| Missamma 
| Nandi Award for Best Actress
| 
|- 
| 2003 
| Tere Naam 
| Zee Cine Award for Best Female Debut 
|  
|- 
| 2003 
| Tere Naam 
| Filmfare Award for Best Actress
| 
|- 
| 2003 
| Tere Naam 
| Star Screen Award for Best Actress
| 
|- 
| 2006
| Sillunu Oru Kaadhal
| Filmfare Award for Best Supporting Actress – Tamil
| 
|- 
| 2007
| Anasuya 
| Filmfare Award for Best Actress - Telugu
| 
|- 
| 2007
| Anasuya 
| Santosham Film Awards for Best Actress
| 
|- 
| 2007
| Sathyabhama 
| Nandi Special Jury Award
|  
|- 
| 2017
| MCA 
| Zee Telugu Apsara Awards 2018 for Best Supporting Actress
|  
|-
| 2018
| MCA 
| Filmfare Award for Best Supporting Actress - Telugu
|  
|- 
| 2018
| MCA 
| SIIMA Award for Best Supporting Actress (Telugu)
|  
|}

References

External links

 

1978 births
Living people
Actresses from New Delhi
Actresses in Hindi cinema
Actresses in Tamil cinema
Actresses in Telugu cinema
Actresses in Kannada cinema
Punjabi people
Filmfare Awards South winners
Actresses in Bhojpuri cinema
Nandi Award winners
Actresses in Malayalam cinema
Actresses in Punjabi cinema
21st-century Indian actresses
Indian film actresses
Zee Cine Awards winners
South Indian International Movie Awards winners